2017 Piala Presiden may refer to either:

 2017 Indonesia President's Cup
 2017 Piala Presiden (Malaysia)